Bert Patrick Reslow (born 28 May 1970 in Malmö) is a Swedish politician who has been a member of the Riksdag since 2010 representing the constituency of Malmö Municipality from 2010 until 2018, during the 2018 general elections he was elected to represent the constituency of Värmland County. He was first elected as an MP for the Moderate Party but defected to the Sweden Democrats in 2017. He is currently taking up seat number 45 in the Riksdag.

When Reslow first joined the Riksdag he was a member of the Justice Committee from October 2010 until September 2014. After the 2014 general election he left the Justice Committee and became a member of the Constitutioninal Committee from October 2014 until June 2017. After the 2018 general elections, he became a member of the Committee on Education in October 2018.

Early life
Reslow was born in Malmö in 1970. He went on to study at Lund University between 1990 and 1998, initially for a law degree before completing a Master's in political history.

Political career
Reslow was elected to parliament for the Moderate Party during the 2010 Swedish general election and subsequently served on the Justice Committee in the Riksdag. In 2017, Reslow announced he was joining the Sweden Democrats, citing concerns over immigration and personal opposition to the December Agreement the Moderates had made to prevent the Sweden Democrats from voting down the budget set by the Swedish Social Democratic Party as his reasons for doing so. He was re-elected to the Riksdag at the 2018 Swedish general election representing the Sweden Democrats.

References

External links

20th-century Swedish lawyers
21st-century Swedish lawyers
1970 births
Lund University alumni
Living people
Politicians from Malmö
Members of the Riksdag 2010–2014
Members of the Riksdag 2014–2018
Members of the Riksdag 2018–2022
Members of the Riksdag from the Sweden Democrats
Members of the Riksdag from the Moderate Party
Members of the Riksdag 2022–2026